Agnatius Paasi (born 30 November 1991) is a Tongan professional rugby league footballer who plays as a  for St Helens in the Betfred Super League and Tonga at international level.

He previously played for the New Zealand Warriors in two separate spells, and also the Gold Coast Titans in the NRL.

Background
Paasi was born in Lapaha, Tonga, and moved to Auckland, New Zealand when he was three years old.

Paasi played his junior football for Mangere East Hawks. At age 17, Paasi moved to Australia on a scholarship to play for Keebra Park State High School where they won the Arrive Alive Cup in 2009. He also played some Australian rules football for the school. He was offered a contract with the Wests Tigers under 20's, but complications with his visa saw him return to New Zealand, where he again played for the Mangere East Hawks before being signed by the New Zealand Warriors.

Playing career

Early career
In 2011, Paasi played for the Warriors Toyota Cup Under-20s team. On 5 October 2011, Paasi played in the Warriors' 2011 NYC Grand Final victory over the North Queensland Cowboys, playing off the interchange bench in the Warriors' 31-30 golden point extra time victory. On 6 October 2011, Paasi was named 18th man for the Junior Kiwis. 

In 2012, Paasi moved on to the Warriors New South Wales Cup team, the Auckland Vulcans, and he also played for the Vulcans in 2013. At the start of 2014 Paasi wasn't contracted to any NRL team but was given a chance to play in the Warriors pre-season games, earning a contract with the Warriors NSW Cup side.

2014
After a few impressive performances in the NSW Cup, Paasi was handed his NRL debut for the New Zealand Warriors in Round 19 against the Brisbane Broncos, where he played off the interchange bench in the Warriors 28-22 loss at Suncorp Stadium. 
This was Paasi’s only first grade match in the 2014 season. He was named as the Warriors NSW Cup Player of the Year. In November, Paasi signed a train and trial contract with the Gold Coast Titans, starting from 2015. On 16 October, Paasi played for Tonga against Papua New Guinea, starting at second-row in the 32-18 loss in Lae.

2015
In Round 1, Paasi made his club debut for the Gold Coast Titans against the Wests Tigers, playing off the interchange bench in the Titans 19-18 loss at Cbus Super Stadium. In Round 4 against the Cronulla-Sutherland Sharks, he scored his first career try in the Titans 24-22 win at Remondis Stadium. Paasi’s good form in the Titans early matches earned him a 2-year contract extension with the Titans. He finished his impressive year with him playing in 18 matches and scoring 2 tries.

2016
In February, Paasi was named in the Titans 2016 NRL Auckland Nines squad, where he was named in the Team of the Tournament. He was described as, "undoubtedly the weekend’s biggest surprise packet" and perhaps the best player of the Nines. Paasi enjoyed a solid 2016 NRL season with him playing in all the Titans 25 matches and scored 5 tries.

2017
Paasi’s 2017 NRL season was limited due to a shoulder injury, playing in 11 matches for the Titans. On 5 November 2017, Paasi was released from his final year of his contract with the Titans to join his former club the New Zealand Warriors on a 2-year deal, starting from 2018.

2019
In Round 24 2019, Paasi played his 100th NRL game in the Warriors 10-31 defeat by the South Sydney Rabbitohs at Mt Smart Stadium in Auckland.

2020
On 13 November, it was announced that Paasi had signed for St Helens on a two-year deal starting in 2021.

2021
In round 1 of the 2021 Super League season, he made his debut for St. Helens in their 29-6 victory over Salford.  Paasi was knocked out in the second half of the game after a collision with Salford player Pauli Pauli. He was awarded Man of the Match on his Challenge Cup debut, spearheading his team's victory over Leeds.

On 17 July, he played for St. Helens in their 26-12 2021 Challenge Cup Final victory over Castleford.
On 9 October, he played for St. Helens in their 2021 Super League Grand Final victory over Catalans Dragons.

2022
On 24 September, Paasi played for St Helens in their 2022 Super League Grand Final victory over Leeds.

2023
On 18 February, Paasi played in St Helens 13-12 upset victory over Penrith in the 2023 World Club Challenge.

References

External links
New Zealand Warriors profile
Gold Coast Titans profile
NRL profile

1991 births
Living people
Auckland rugby league team players
Gold Coast Titans players
Junior Kiwis players
Mangere East Hawks players
New Zealand Warriors players
People educated at Keebra Park State High School
People educated at St Paul's College, Auckland
Rugby league second-rows
Rugby league props
Rugby league centres
St Helens R.F.C. players
Tonga national rugby league team players
Tongan emigrants to New Zealand
Tongan rugby league players
Tweed Heads Seagulls players